The Eight-point Regulation of the Centre is a set of regulations stipulated by Xi Jinping, the General Secretary of the Chinese Communist Party. They were first announced on 4 December 2012, at a meeting of the Politburo of the Chinese Communist Party. These regulations were aimed at instilling more discipline among party members, and making the party "closer to the masses". In effect, it calls for party members and officials in particular to "do real work, say real things", and understand the practical situation on the ground. It seeks to tackle the culture of privilege that has permeated Chinese officialdom during the rule of his predecessors.

Regulations

See also
 Sumptuary law

References 

2012 in China
Ideology of the Chinese Communist Party